Isaac Snell (born November 4, 1981 in Pipestone, Minnesota) is a former American football guard. He was signed by the New York Jets as an undrafted free agent in 2005. He played college football at North Dakota State. Snell has also been a member of the Denver Broncos.

External links
Denver Broncos bio
Tennessee Titans bio

1981 births
Living people
People from Pipestone, Minnesota
American football offensive guards
North Dakota State Bison football players
New York Jets players
Tennessee Titans players
Denver Broncos players
Sioux Falls Storm players